Shafferograptis is a genus of moths belonging to the family Tortricidae. It contains only one species, Shafferograptis michaeli, which is found in western Malaysia and Brunei. The habitat consists of lowland dipterocarp forests.

The wingspan is about 11 mm. The costa and postmedian interfascia of the forewings are yellow cream, but whiter along the grey basal and postmedian blotch. The costa, costal third of termen and median interfascia are dotted brown-black. The hindwings are brownish grey.

Etymology
The genus name and species name honour Michael Shaffer, former curator at the Natural History Museum, London.

See also
List of Tortricidae genera

References

External links
tortricidae.com

Tortricini